The 1991 US Open was a tennis tournament played on outdoor hard courts at the USTA National Tennis Center in New York City in New York in the United States. It was the 111th edition of the US Open and was held from August 26 to September 8, 1991.

Seniors

Men's singles

 Stefan Edberg defeated  Jim Courier 6–2, 6–4, 6–0
 It was Edberg's 5th career Grand Slam title and his 1st US Open title.

Women's singles

 Monica Seles defeated  Martina Navratilova 7–6(7–1), 6–1 
 It was Seles' 4th career Grand Slam title and her 1st US Open title.

Men's doubles

 John Fitzgerald /  Anders Järryd defeated  Scott Davis /  David Pate 6–3, 3–6, 6–3, 6–3 
 It was Fitzgerald's 9th and last career Grand Slam title and his 3rd US Open title. It was Järryd's 8th and last career Grand Slam title and his 2nd US Open title.

Women's doubles

 Pam Shriver /  Natasha Zvereva defeated  Jana Novotná /  Larisa Savchenko 6–4, 4–6, 7–6(7–5)
 It was Shriver's 22nd and last career Grand Slam title and her 5th US Open title. It was Zvereva's 4th career Grand Slam title and her 1st US Open title.

Mixed doubles

 Manon Bollegraf /  Tom Nijssen defeated  Arantxa Sánchez Vicario /  Emilio Sánchez 6–2, 7–6(7–2)
 It was Bollegraf's 2nd career Grand Slam title and her 1st US Open title. It was Nijssen's 2nd and last career Grand Slam title and his only US Open title.

Juniors

Boys' singles

 Leander Paes defeated  Karim Alami 6–4, 6–4

Girls' singles

 Karina Habšudová defeated  Anne Mall 6–1, 6–3

Boys' doubles

 Karim Alami /  John-Laffnie de Jager defeated  Michael Joyce /  Vince Spadea 6–4, 6–7, 6–1

Girls' doubles

 Kristin Godridge /  Nicole Pratt defeated  Åsa Carlsson /  Cătălina Cristea 7–6, 7–5

External links
 Official US Open website

 
 

 
US Open
US Open (tennis) by year
US Open
US Open
US Open
US Open